Blake Alphonso Higgs (1915 – 1986), better known as "Blind Blake", was the best-known performer of goombay and calypso in the Bahamas from the 1930s to the 1960s.

Biography
Higgs was born in 1915 in Matthew Town, Inagua, Bahamas. For much of his career, Blind Blake was based at the Royal Victoria Hotel in Nassau. Included in his wide repertoire was "Love, Love Alone", a song (by Trinidadian calypsonian Caresser) about the abdication of Edward VIII. Blind Blake's version of this calypso is said to have been enjoyed by the former king himself, who, as the Duke of Windsor, served as Governor of the Bahamas during World War II.

Higgs played the banjo and sang, releasing four albums during his tenure at the Royal Victoria Hotel, one with singer Lou Adams, and several other lesser albums towards the end of his career. His first four albums were released on Floridian label Art, including a 10" with Lou Adams. 

Although Higgs was never famous in his own right, his music has been covered by various famous artists, including Dave Van Ronk, James "Stump" Johnson, Pete Seeger, and Lord Mouse and the Kalypso Katz. The Beach Boys covered his 1952 recording of the Caribbean folk song "John B Sail" and called it "Sloop John B".

His style was a mix of Dixieland jazz, calypso/goombay, and American folk, probably because of the close proximity the Bahamas has to the USA. For several decades, he was arguably the most important figure in the Bahamian tourist entertainment industry. One of his most famous songs, the medley "Little Nassau/Peas and Rice", written during the US prohibition era, is about the easy access to alcoholic beverages in Nassau, then complaining of the locals' frustration with a diet of peas and rice.

His ballad "Run Come See Jerusalem" is of particular interest as it describes a historical event of the 1929 Bahamas Hurricane and has been covered by many artists in the 1950-60s Folk Revival. It can be heard in a vintage recording with Blind Blake leading on YouTube.

Discography
 Blind Blake and the Royal Victoria Hotel "Calypso" Orchestra: A Group of Bahamian Songs (1951)
 Blind Blake and the Royal Victoria Hotel "Calypso" Orchestra: A Second Album of Bahamian Songs (1952)
 Blind Blake and the Royal Victoria Hotel "Calypso" Orchestra: A Third Album of Bahamian Songs (1952)
 Lou Adams Plays Bahamiana Calypso featuring vocals by Blind Blake (1952)
 Blind Blake and the Royal Victoria Hotel "Calypso" Orchestra: A Fifth Album of Bahamian Songs (1952)
 A Cultural Experience (with Pandora Gibson) (1976)
 Blind Blake & The Royal Victoria Hotel Calypsos: Bahamian Songs (2009)
 Bahamas Goombay 1951-1959, a vintage Bahamas music anthology (Frémeaux et Associés, 2011)
 Calypso - The Dance Master Classics 1944–1958

Footnotes

External links
 Illustrated (Bahamian) Blind Blake discography
 Blind Blake article by Elijah Wald
 

1915 births
1986 deaths

Bahamian singers
Calypsonians
People from Nassau, Bahamas
Blind musicians
People from Inagua
20th-century Bahamian people
20th-century male musicians